Nodar Mammadov (born 3 June 1988 in Kaspi, Georgia) is an Azerbaijani football defender who plays for Kapaz PFK.

Career statistics

References

External links

1988 births
Living people
Azerbaijani footballers
Azerbaijan international footballers
Georgian Azerbaijanis
Association football defenders
Azerbaijani expatriate footballers
Qarabağ FK players
MOIK Baku players
Gabala FC players
Ravan Baku FC players
Sumgayit FK players
Khazar Lankaran FK players
Khazar Baku FK players
Turan-Tovuz IK players
AZAL PFK players
Azerbaijan Premier League players
Expatriate footballers in Cyprus